James Oliver Rigney Jr. (October 17, 1948 – September 16, 2007), better known by his pen name Robert Jordan, was an American author of epic fantasy. He is known best for his series  The Wheel of Time (finished by Brandon Sanderson after Jordan's death) which comprises 14 books and a prequel novel. He is one of several writers to have written original Conan the Barbarian novels; his are considered by fans to be some of the best of the non-Robert E. Howard efforts. Jordan also published historical fiction using the pseudonym Reagan O'Neal, a western as Jackson O'Reilly, and dance criticism as Chang Lung. Jordan claimed to have ghostwritten an "international thriller" that is still believed to have been written by someone else.

Early life
Jordan was born in Charleston, South Carolina. He went to Clemson University after high school, but dropped out after one year and enlisted in the U.S. Army. He served two tours of duty during the Vietnam War as a helicopter gunner. He was awarded the Distinguished Flying Cross with oak leaf cluster, the Bronze Star with "V" and oak leaf cluster, and two Vietnamese Gallantry Crosses with palm. 

After returning from Vietnam in 1970, Jordan studied physics at The Citadel. He graduated in 1974 with a Bachelor of Science degree and began working for the U.S. Navy as a nuclear engineer. He began writing in 1977.

Personal life
Robert Jordan was a history buff and enjoyed hunting, fishing, sailing, poker, chess, pool, and pipe-collecting. He described himself as a "High church" Episcopalian and received communion more than once a week. He lived with his wife, Harriet McDougal, who works as a book editor (currently with Tor Books; she was also Jordan's editor) in a house built in 1797.

Illness and death
On March 23, 2006, Jordan disclosed that he had been diagnosed with cardiac amyloidosis and that, with treatment, his median life expectancy was four years. In a separate weblog post, he encouraged his fans not to worry about him and stated that he intended to have a long and creative life.

He began chemotherapy at Mayo Clinic during early April 2006. He participated in a study of the drug Revlimid, which had been approved recently for multiple myeloma but not yet tested for primary amyloidosis.

Jordan died on September 16, 2007, from complications stemming from Multiple Myeloma. His funeral service was on September 19, 2007. He was cremated and his ashes buried in the churchyard of St. James Church in Goose Creek, outside Charleston, South Carolina.

Jordan's papers can be found in the special collections of the College of Charleston.

Selected works

The Wheel of Time

Jordan published 11 books of 14 in the main sequence of the Wheel of Time series. Reviewers and fans of the earlier books noted a slowing of the pace of events in the last few installments written solely by Jordan owing to the expansion of the scale of the series as a whole. Because of his health problems, Jordan did not work at full force on the final installment A Memory of Light (later split into three volumes beginning with The Gathering Storm), but blog entries confirmed that he continued work on it until his death, and he shared all of the significant plot details with his family not long before he died. He maintained that in doing so the book would get published even if "the worst actually happens". On December 7, 2007, Tor Books announced that Brandon Sanderson had been chosen to finish the Wheel of Time series. Harriet McDougal, Jordan's widow, chose him after reading Mistborn: The Final Empire.

All paperback (PB) page totals given are for the most widely available mass-market paperback editions. The page count for the hardback (HB) editions does not include glossary or appendix page counts.

The World of Robert Jordan's The Wheel of Time is an encyclopedia for the series about the unnamed world where the plot takes place, which is often referred to by fans of the series as the World of the Wheel. It is published in the United States by Tor Books and in the United Kingdom by Orbit Books. The bulk of the text was written by Teresa Patterson based on notes and information provided by Jordan, who also served as the overall editor on the project. While the information in the guide is broadly canonical, the book is deliberately written with vague, biased, or even downright false (or guessed) information in places, as Patterson felt this would reflect a key theme of the series (the mutability of knowledge across time and distance).

Conan the Barbarian

Jordan was one of several writers who has written Conan the Barbarian stories. When Tom Doherty obtained the rights, he needed a novel very quickly, so Jordan's wife Harriet McDougal recommended him because she knew he had written his first novel, Warriors of the Altaii, in thirteen days.
So he thought I could write something fast, and he was right, and I liked it. It was fun writing something completely over the top, full of purple prose, and in a weak moment I agreed to do five more and the novelization of the second Conan movie. I've decided that those things were very good discipline for me. I had to work with a character and a world that had already been created and yet find a way to say something new about the character and the world. That was a very good exercise.
Conan the Invincible (1982)
Conan the Defender (1982)
Conan the Unconquered (1983)
Conan the Triumphant (1983)
Conan the Magnificent (1984)
Conan the Destroyer (1984) (adaptation of the movie of the same title)
Conan the Victorious (1984)
They were packed into two separate volumes par Conan the Destroyer:
The Conan Chronicles
The Further Chronicles of Conan (The Conan Chronicles II in the UK, different contents)

Jordan also compiled a well-known Conan Chronology.

References

External links

Robert Jordan at Tor Books
Robert Jordan at Worlds Without End
Robert Jordan's Official Blog 

1948 births
2007 deaths
20th-century American novelists
21st-century American novelists
American Episcopalians
American fantasy writers
Anglican writers
Conan the Barbarian novelists
Deaths from amyloidosis
Writers from Charleston, South Carolina
The Citadel, The Military College of South Carolina alumni
The Wheel of Time
United States Army officers
Recipients of the Distinguished Flying Cross (United States)
United States Navy officers
American male novelists
Novelists from South Carolina
United States Army personnel of the Vietnam War
20th-century American male writers
21st-century American male writers
20th-century pseudonymous writers
21st-century pseudonymous writers